Toine Daniël van Huizen (born 13 February 1990) is a Dutch professional footballer who plays as a centre-back for FC Dordrecht in the Eerste Divisie. He formerly played for AZ, Telstar, Sparta Rotterdam and De Graafschap.

Club career
Van Huizen began his professional career with AZ. He was sent on loan to SC Telstar for the 2010–11 season. He returned to Alkmaar in January 2011 where he was part of the first-team squad of manager Gertjan Verbeek. Without making an appearance for AZ, he moved to Sparta Rotterdam in January 2012. In July 2019, he signed with De Graafschap after playing for six years for Telstar.

On 12 July 2021, Van Huizen signed with FC Dordrecht.

References

External links

 Career stats & Profile - Voetbal International

1990 births
Living people
People from Beemster
Association football central defenders
Dutch footballers
AZ Alkmaar players
SC Telstar players
Sparta Rotterdam players
De Graafschap players
FC Dordrecht players
Eredivisie players
Eerste Divisie players
Footballers from North Holland